Aquidabã is a municipality located in the Brazilian state of Sergipe. Its population was 21,681 (2020) and its area is 357 km².

References

Municipalities in Sergipe